The Walnut Street Historic District is a national historic district located in Springfield, Missouri, United States. The district encompasses more than 150 one and two story frame, brick, cast-stone, or stone dwellings in a thirteen block area. The district includes parts of East Walnut Street, East Elm Street, East McDaniel Street, Cordova Court, South Hampton Avenue, South Florence Avenue, and South National Avenue. The district developed between about 1870 and 1940, with 21 buildings surviving from before 1900, and 59 buildings dating between 1901 and 1910.

It was added to the National Register of Historic Places in 1985, with a boundary decrease in 2001 and boundary increase in 2002.

References

Historic districts on the National Register of Historic Places in Missouri
Italianate architecture in Missouri
Queen Anne architecture in Missouri
Bungalow architecture in Missouri
Buildings and structures in Springfield, Missouri
National Register of Historic Places in Greene County, Missouri